The History of Turkey is the history of lands called Turkey after Turkish migration.

The History of Turkey may also refer to:
 Seljuk Turks (1000–1300) Sultanate of Rûm
 Anatolian beyliks (11th-17th centuries)
 Ottoman Empire (1299–1922)
 History of the Republic of Turkey (since 1923)
History of Anatolia
Names of Anatolia
 Turkey (bird)#History and naming

de:Geschichte der Türkei